Richard or Rick Gates may refer to: 

Richard Gates (sailor) (born 1943)
Rick Gates (Internet pioneer) (born 1956)
Rick Gates (political consultant) (born 1972)
Ricky Gates, train engineer